In the Catholic Church, The Venerable is the title used for a person who has been posthumously declared "heroic in virtue" during the investigation and process leading to canonization as a saint.

The following is an incomplete list of people declared to be venerable.  The list is in alphabetical order by Christian name but, if necessary, by surname or the place or attribute part of the name.

See also

List of blesseds
List of saints
List of Servants of God
List of venerated couples
Venerable

References

External links
Patron Saints Index

 
Venerated Catholics
Ven